Jake Luton (born April 11, 1996) is an American football quarterback for the New Orleans Saints of the National Football League (NFL). He was selected by the Jacksonville Jaguars in the sixth round of the 2020 NFL Draft.

Early years
Born and raised in Marysville, Washington, Luton played football and baseball at Marysville-Pilchuck High school and graduated in 2014. He was a two star recruit and committed to the University of Idaho in Moscow. At the time, the Vandals were an FBS program in the Sun Belt Conference under second-year head coach Paul Petrino.

College career

Idaho
Redshirted as a true freshman in 2014, Luton played in eight games in 2015, threw for 408 yards, and ran for five touchdowns. In June 2016, he announced his departure from Idaho.

Ventura College
Luton transferred to two-year Ventura College in Southern California for his redshirt sophomore season in 2016. In eleven games, he threw for 3,551 yards and forty touchdowns.

Oregon State
Luton transferred to Oregon State University in Corvallis, led by third-year head coach Gary Andersen, and won the starting quarterback job in 2017. He suffered a back injury, which ended his season after starting just four games. Luton was granted a sixth year of eligibility after his fifth-year senior season in 2018. He started eleven games in 2019, throwing for 28 touchdowns with just three interceptions.

Statistics

Professional career

Jacksonville Jaguars
Luton was selected by the Jacksonville Jaguars in the sixth round with the 189th overall pick in the 2020 NFL Draft.

On November 2, 2020, it was announced that Luton would make his first career start in Week 9 against the Houston Texans due to starter Gardner Minshew being out with a thumb injury. He completed 26 of 38 passes for 304 yards with one touchdown and one interception, as well as a 13-yard rushing score, in the Jaguars' 27–25 loss. A day after the Texans game it was announced that Luton would fill in for Minshew again in Week 10 against the Green Bay Packers. He completed 18 of 35 passes for 169 yards with one touchdown and one interception in the Jaguars' 24–20 loss. Luton was named the starter again in Week 11 against the Pittsburgh Steelers. Luton had his worst performance yet against the Steelers, completing 16 of 37 passes for 151 yards with no touchdowns and four interceptions in the Jaguars' 27–3 loss. On November 25, 2020, the Jaguars announced they benched Luton for Mike Glennon due to his recent struggles.

On August 31, 2021, Luton was waived as part of the final roster cuts.

Seattle Seahawks
On September 2, 2021, Luton signed with the Seattle Seahawks. He was waived on September 28, 2021, and re-signed to the practice squad. Luton was activated on October 10 following an injury to Russell Wilson. He was released and resigned to the practice squad after the Seahawks signed Jacob Eason on October 21. He was released on November 15.

Miami Dolphins
On November 17, 2021, Luton was signed to the Miami Dolphins practice squad.

Jacksonville Jaguars (second stint)
On February 11, 2022, Luton signed a reserve/future contract with the Jacksonville Jaguars. He was waived on August 15, but re-signed eight days later. He was waived again on August 26, 2022.

New Orleans Saints
On September 6, 2022, Luton signed with the practice squad of the New Orleans Saints. He was elevated to the active roster on October 1, 2022. On October 15, 2022, Luton was waived and re-signed to the practice squad. He signed a reserve/future contract on January 9, 2023.

NFL career statistics

References

External links 

New Orleans Saints bio
Oregon State Beavers bio

1996 births
American football quarterbacks
Idaho Vandals football players
Jacksonville Jaguars players
Living people
Miami Dolphins players
New Orleans Saints players
Oregon State Beavers football players
People from Marysville, Washington
Players of American football from Washington (state)
Seattle Seahawks players
Sportspeople from the Seattle metropolitan area
Ventura Pirates football players